Scinax cruentomma is a species of frog in the family Hylidae. It is found in the upper Amazon Basin of southern Colombia, eastern Ecuador, northeastern and east-central Peru, and western Brazil; its presence is French Guiana is dispted. The specific name cruentomma is derived from the Greek cruentos meaning "bloody" and omma meaning "eye", referring to the red streak in the eye of this frog. This species is also known as the Manaus snouted treefrog.

Description
Adult males measure  and adult females  in snout–vent length. The snout is rounded. The tympanum is distinct. The fingers lack webbing whereas the toes are half-webbed. Skin is smooth to finely shagreened. The dorsum has creamy tan to uniform dark brown coloration, usually with brown markings. These that typically consist of canthal stripe, supratympanic stripe, and irregular (often longitudinal) marks on body. About half of the individuals have transverse bars on the limbs. The flanks are pale with or without small dark spots. The iris is silvery bronze and has a median horizontal red streak.

The male advertisement call is a single, moderately long, poorly modulated, fast-pulsed note.

Habitat and conservation
It has also been found in secondary forest and banana grove habitats. Breeding takes place in ponds both in clearings and in the forest. It is an abundant and adaptable species that is not facing significant threats.

References

cruentomma
Amphibians of Brazil
Amphibians of Colombia
Amphibians of Ecuador
Amphibians of Peru
Taxa named by William Edward Duellman
Amphibians described in 1972
Taxonomy articles created by Polbot